WMFE-FM (90.7 MHz) is a listener-supported FM radio station in Orlando, Florida, owned by Community Communications, Inc.  WMFE-FM is Central Florida's National Public Radio (NPR) member station, with a format of news and information.  Most programming is simulcast on 89.5 WMFV in Cedar Creek, Florida.  The radio studios are on East Colonial Drive in Orlando.

WMFE-FM has an effective radiated power (ERP) of 100,000 watts, the maximum for non-grandfathered FM stations.  The transmitter is on TV Tower Road in Bithlo, Florida, amid the towers for other Orlando-area FM and TV stations.

History
On Monday, July 14, 1980, the station signed on.  In its early years it played a mix of classical music and jazz, along with news and information from NPR. The jazz music was dropped in 1983. Prior to that year, NPR programming was only available on a part-time basis via University of Central Florida station WUCF-FM (WFTU-FM until 1978), leaving Orlando as the largest radio market in the nation without a full-time public radio station.

Over time, the music shows were replaced with more public radio informational shows.  In November 2009, the primary HD1 channel switched to an all-news/talk format with programs from NPR and other public radio sources.  The HD2 digital subchannel became the source for classical music, with some weekend specialty music.

In April 2011, Community Communications announced that it had entered into a definitive agreement to sell PBS network affiliate sister station WMFE-TV, to Daystar Television Network, due to economic conditions. The organization said it would keep WMFE-FM's radio station and call sign, since its listener contributions were able to meet expenses.

The sale of WMFE-TV to Daystar was later cancelled.  Instead, Community Communications sold the television station in 2012 to the University of Central Florida, which intended to keep the PBS programming.  The TV station's call letters switched to WUCF-TV.

On September 25, 2017, it was announced that WMFE-FM would acquire WKSG in Cedar Creek, Florida, (near Ocala) from Daystar Public Radio, Inc.  Upon approval of the deal, WMFE-FM switched the format on WKSG to public radio news/talk.  It provides public radio coverage to underserved areas of Central Florida, including portions of Lake and Marion counties. The call letters on WKSG were changed to WMFV, similar to WMFE's call sign.

References

External links

MFE-FM
NPR member stations
Classical music radio stations in the United States
News and talk radio stations in the United States
Radio stations established in 1980
1980 establishments in Florida